Emily Jean Csikos (born July 29, 1988 in Calgary, Alberta) is a female water polo player from Canada. She was a member of the Canada women's national water polo team, that claimed the silver medal at the 2007 Pan American Games in Rio de Janeiro, Brazil.

She recently graduated from the University of California at Berkeley majoring in Interdisciplinary Field Studies as well as playing on women's water polo team. She currently holds the record for all-time highest goals, along with earning All American honorable mention in 2009 and 1st team All American in 2010,11 and 2013.

See also
 List of World Aquatics Championships medalists in water polo

References

External links
 

1988 births
Living people
Canadian female water polo players
Sportspeople from Calgary
Water polo players at the 2007 Pan American Games
Water polo players at the 2011 Pan American Games
Pan American Games silver medalists for Canada
Pan American Games medalists in water polo
Medalists at the 2011 Pan American Games
World Aquatics Championships medalists in water polo